USS Mayfield Victory (AK-232) was a  acquired by the U.S. Navy during World War II.  She served in the Pacific Ocean theatre of operations through the end of the war and then returned to the United States for disposal.

Victory built in California
Mayfield Victory (AK 232) was laid down under U.S. Maritime Commission contract 10 August 1944 by Permanente Metals Corporation, Yard 1, Richmond, California; launched 10 October 1944; sponsored by Miss Evelyn Fuller; acquired by the Navy from the Maritime Commission under loan charter 19 November 1944; and commissioned the same day.

World War II operations
Following shakedown off San Pedro, California, into December, Mayfield Victory loaded ammunition at Aberdeen, Washington, and at Puget Sound, Washington, before sailing for the South Pacific Ocean the 24th. She arrived Pearl Harbor 1 January 1945 to unload her cargo and 15 days later returned to the U.S. West Coast, arriving San Francisco, California, 22 January.
 
Mayfield Victory departed San Francisco 11 February for the Caroline Islands, via Eniwetok, the Marshall Islands, arriving Ulithi 3 March. She remained there until 13 April when she continued on to the Ryukyu Islands for the Okinawa campaign 1 April to 21 June, the second American objective in the “hop, skip, and jump” to the Empire of Japan warned against by Japanese Admiral Ito. The cargo ship spent 4 weeks in the area, operating with Task Group 50.8 until 23 April when she anchored in Kerama Retto. During the latter period Mayfield Victory continually issued ammunition, often under direct enemy air attack.
 
On 14 May Mayfield Victory steamed for Ulithi, arriving the 21st. Four days later she continued on to the Philippine Islands for a 30-day stopover at Leyte. The ship then returned to Kerama Retto 1 July. On 8 July she moved to Buckner Bay, Okinawa, where she remained on supply duty until late October.
 
On 25 October Mayfield Victory got underway for home, stopping at Seattle, Washington, in December before arriving San Francisco 9 February 1946.

Post-war decommissioning
She decommissioned 5 April 1946 and was delivered to the War Shipping Administration (WSA) for U.S. Maritime Commission service into 1969 as a freighter operated by American Mail Line, Seattle, Washington.

References

 
 NavSource Online: Service Ship Photo Archive - AK-232 Mayfield Victory

 

Boulder Victory-class cargo ships
Ships built in Richmond, California
1944 ships
Ammunition ships of the United States Navy
World War II auxiliary ships of the United States
Wilmington Reserve Fleet
Olympia Reserve Fleet
Suisun Bay Reserve Fleet